Montagudet is a commune in the Tarn-et-Garonne department in the Occitanie region in southern France.

Geography
The Séoune forms part of the commune's northern border. The Barguelonnette forms most of the commune's southern border.

See also
Communes of the Tarn-et-Garonne department

References

Communes of Tarn-et-Garonne